Jezreel (Yizre'el, lit. God will sow) may refer to the following places and topics:

 Jezreel (city), an ancient Israelite city
 Jezreel Valley, a valley in northern Israel
 Jezreel Valley railway, railway in northern Israel
 Jezreel Valley Regional Council, regional council in northern Israel
 Yizre'el, a kibbutz in northern Israel